DronesVision is a Taiwanese arms manufacturer, specializing in militarized unmanned aerial vehicles and anti-UAV technologies.

History 
The company was established in 2010. In 2014, they launched their first product, the SKYNET anti-drone electronic warfare system. In 2018, they launched the AR-1, a drone capable of carrying and using AR-style rifles. In 2022, they launched the Revolver 860, a drone capable of delivering 8 60mm mortar rounds.

Customers

Taiwan 
DronesVision has supplied anti-drone systems to the Taiwanese military.

Ukraine 
In 2022, Revolver 860 drones sold to Poland were transferred to Ukraine for use during the 2022 Russian invasion of Ukraine.

See also 
 Aerovironment
 Defense industry of Taiwan

References

External links
 

Unmanned aerial vehicle manufacturers
Defence companies of Taiwan
2015 establishments in Taiwan
Companies based in Keelung
Taiwanese companies established in 2015